The NATO Days in Ostrava & Czech Air Force Days are the largest air, army and security show in Europe. It aims to present to the general public the wide spectrum of the resources and the capabilities of the Czech Republic and its allies in the field of security provision.

NATO Days in Ostrava consist of meetings, presentations, workshops and displays of military and security equipment culminating in a main event held at Leoš Janáček Airport Ostrava, near Ostrava, Czech Republic.

During the event there is an opportunity to see military hardware, police and rescue technology, dynamic shows of special units training, air displays and the chance to see different kinds of equipment used by units. This is the only event that brings the latest technology used by soldiers, fire fighters, policemen, customs officers, the prison service, the municipal police and other elite units in one location.

The organizers of NATO Days in Ostrava are the Jagello 2000 Association, the Joint Forces Headquarters of the Armed Forces of the Czech Republic, the Fire Rescue Brigade of the Moravian-Silesian Region, the Police of the Czech Republic, the Emergency Rescue Service of the Moravian-Silesian Region, and Leoš Janáček Airport Ostrava.

History 
NATO Day in Ostrava 2001, NATO Day in Ostrava 2002
 The first two years took place at exhibition ground Černá louka in Ostrava city centre. Despite very limited space area the visitors had an opportunity to see special army and rescue equipment, armament of special reconnaissance units, training of police officers, dynamic displays of anti-terrorist commando or searching for drugs.
NATO Day in Ostrava 2003
 since the third year, the event takes place regularly in mid-September at Leoš Janáček Ostrava Airport and therefore allows to have not only more attractive ground dynamic, but most importantly also air dynamic displays 
 unlike during previous two years, visitors could seen the latest air force army equipment not only above their heads, but also on static displays directly in airport area
NATO Day in Ostrava 2004
 for the first time ever, the Czech public had an opportunity to enter the board of legendary Airborne Early Warning and Control aircraft (AWACS) from German Geilenkirchen Air Base
 visitors could go through the entire equipment of field hospital or watch training of world-famous Liberec Chemical Unit

References

External links 
Official Website

Air shows
Ostrava
Aviation in the Czech Republic
NATO